Griha Pravesh is a 1979 Indian Hindi-language drama film directed by Basu Bhattacharya. The film stars Sanjeev Kumar, Sharmila Tagore and Sarika. The film, about adultery, was the last of Basu Battacharya's introspective trilogy on marital discord and decay in an urban setting, which included Anubhav (1971), Avishkaar (1973).

Plot

Cast
Sanjeev Kumar ...  Amar
Sharmila Tagore ...  Mansi
Sarika ...  Sapna
Master Bittoo ...  Babla (child)
Sudha Chopra ...  Quarrelsome Neighbor
Kanu Roy
Gulzar  ... Guest Appearance in song
Manik Dutt
Vimal Joshi
Raj Verma
Nandlal Sharma
R.S. Chopra
Satya Banerjee
Shashi Jain
Tarun Mukherjee
Nilesh
Khokha Mukherji

Soundtrack

Reception 
Sumit Mitra of India Today said, "Normally, for a good director, the story comes first and the style follows. The craft is determined by the characters and the attitudes inherent in the script. But it is the other way round with Basu".

References

External links
 

1979 films
1970s Hindi-language films
1979 drama films
Indian drama films
Films about adultery in India
Films directed by Basu Bhattacharya